Minimum bounding circle may refer to:

 Bounding sphere
 Smallest circle problem